Vincent Joseph Pierre is an American politician. He served as a Democratic member for the 44th district of the Louisiana House of Representatives.

Pierre graduated from the Holy Rosary Institute, and then attended at the Southern University, where he earned his degree. Pierre worked as a businessperson. In 2012, he won the election for the 44th district of the Louisiana House of Representatives, succeeding Rickey Hardy. He assumed his office on January 9, 2012.

References 

Living people
Place of birth missing (living people)
Year of birth missing (living people)
Democratic Party members of the Louisiana House of Representatives
21st-century American politicians
Southern University alumni
Businesspeople from Louisiana
African-American state legislators in Louisiana
Activists for African-American civil rights
21st-century African-American politicians
20th-century African-American people